The Office is a British sitcom that was originally broadcast by the BBC in the United Kingdom from 2001 to 2003 as the original series of The Office. The television programme was created and written by Ricky Gervais and Stephen Merchant; the former also played the main character, manager David Brent. The series is set in the Slough office of a fictional paper merchant, Wernham Hogg, and is presented in a mockumentary format depicting the everyday lives of its employees.

Brent tries to be a friend and an entertainer as well as a boss, and is often annoying as a result. His sycophantic assistant Gareth Keenan (Mackenzie Crook) annoys and is often pranked by sales representative Tim Canterbury (Martin Freeman), whose relationship with receptionist Dawn Tinsley (Lucy Davis) is a major story arc, despite her engagement to warehouse worker Lee (Joel Beckett). Minor characters include droning and crass office worker Keith Bishop (Ewen MacIntosh), Brent's brash and sexist friend Chris Finch (Ralph Ineson) and Brent's bosses Jennifer Taylor-Clarke (Stirling Gallacher) and later Neil Godwin (Patrick Baladi).

The programme ran for two series of six half-hour episodes each: the first aired from July to August 2001, and the second from September to November 2002. A two-part Christmas special aired on 26 and 27 December 2003. There are 14 episodes in total. Series 1 and 2 were originally broadcast on BBC Two, but the Christmas episodes were moved to BBC One to increase viewership following the previous series' popularity. Both series, as well as the Christmas specials, have been released on DVD in Regions 1, 2 and 4. The programme has won numerous awards, including two British Comedy Awards and two Golden Globe.  The Office has also been remade in several countries, of which the American adaptation has been the most popular and longest-running.

Episodes were shot on tape, then filmized in post-production to achieve the documentary-type atmosphere. The deleted scenes on the DVDs are presented raw, pre-filmization.

Series overview

Episodes

Series 1 (2001)

Series 2 (2002)

Christmas specials (2003)

After the conclusion of the second series, creators Ricky Gervais and Stephen Merchant stated that no more series would be filmed. However, they did write and film two additional episodes, 45 and 50 minutes in duration, which first aired in the United Kingdom on BBC One on 26 December (Boxing Day) and 27 December 2003.

The Return of Brent (2013)
As part of Red Nose Day 2013 and to celebrate ten years since the end of The Office, a one-off special short episode catches up with David, the former manager of the Slough branch of Wernham Hogg Paper Merchants.

See also

 David Brent: Life on the Road

References

External links

 List of 
 List of 
 
 

Office, The (British TV series)
Office, The